The Boston Common (also known as the Common) is a public park in downtown Boston, Massachusetts. It is the oldest city park in the United States.

The Common is part of the Emerald Necklace of parks and parkways that extend from the Common south to Franklin Park in Jamaica Plain, Roxbury, and Dorchester. The visitors' center for the city of Boston is located on the Tremont Street side of the park.

The Central Burying Ground is on the Boylston Street side of Boston Common and contains the graves of the artist Gilbert Stuart and the composer William Billings. Also buried there are Samuel Sprague and his son, Charles Sprague, one of America's earliest poets. Samuel Sprague was a participant in the Boston Tea Party and fought in the Revolutionary War. The Common was designated as a Boston Landmark by the Boston Landmarks Commission in 1977.

The Common is sometimes erroneously referred to as the "Boston Commons". This stems from its use as a town commons starting in 1634; the modern park's name forgoes the "S."

History

Blaxton's habitation 
The first European owner of the land that became the Common was William Blaxton. Blaxton had arrived in Massachusetts as chaplain to the Robert Gorges expedition that landed in Weymouth in 1623. Every other member of this colonization attempt returned to England before the winter of 1625. By this time Blaxton had migrated five miles north to the Shawmut Peninsula, then a 1 mi2 rocky bulge at the end of a swampy isthmus, surrounded on all sides by mudflats. Blaxton lived entirely alone for five years on the peninsula that would become Boston.

Puritans
In 1630, Blaxton wrote a decisive letter to the Puritan group led by Isaac Johnson, whose colony of Charlestown was then failing from lack of fresh water. Blaxton advertised the excellent natural springs of the peninsula and invited Johnson's group to settle with him on it, which they did on 7 September 1630. Johnson died less than three weeks later and Blaxton negotiated a grant of 50 acres around his home on the western edge of the peninsula from the new governor of the colony, John Winthrop. This amounted to around 10% of the available land on the Shawmut Peninsula and stretched from what is now Beacon Hill to Boylston Street. One of Johnson's last official acts as the leader of the Charleston community, before dying on 30 September 1630, was to name the new settlement across the river "Boston," after his seaside hometown in Lincolnshire, England, from which he, his wife (namesake of the Arbella) and John Cotton (grandfather of Cotton Mather) had emigrated to New England.

Boston's common field 
However, the Episcopalian Blaxton quickly tired of the Puritan church fathers and the difficulty of retaining such a large plot of land in a town that had grown to nearly 4,000 people by 1633. This led Blaxton to sell all but six of his 50 acres back to Winthrop in 1634 for ₤30 ($5,455 adjusted). The governor purchased the land through a one-time tax on residents amounting to 6 shillings (around $50 adjusted) per person. Those 44 acres became the town commons of Puritan Boston and today form the bulk of Boston Common.

The Common was used for a variety of purposes until its formal conversion into a public park during the 1830s. These uses gradually became more urban as the city developed, shifting from pastureland, to military drilling field, execution grounds, public gathering place and finally parkland.

During the 1630s, the Common was used by many families as a cow pasture. This traditional use for a commons quickly ended when the large herds kept by affluent families led to overgrazing and the collapse of the Common as pastureland. In 1646, grazing was limited to 70 cows at a time. The Common continued to host cows until they were formally banned in 1830 by Mayor Harrison Gray Otis.

Further public uses

Civic institutions 

What is now called the Granary Burying Ground, located at the southern edge of the Common, was established in 1660. Two years later, part of this land was separated from the Common, with the southwest portion used for public buildings—including a granary and house of correction—and the north portion dedicated to an almshouse (probably the first in the Thirteen Colonies).

Execution grounds 

Boston Common took over from the gibbet, just outside the gate guarding Boston Neck, as the town execution grounds and was used for public hangings until 1817. Most of these executions were carried out from the limb of a large oak, which was replaced with a gallows in 1769. Those executed included common criminals, military deserters, Indians, enslaved persons, captured pirates, and—most notably—religious dissidents. The most famous victims of the Common's era as an execution grounds were the group of Quakers known almost immediately after their deaths as the Boston Martyrs. The most famous of the Boston Martyrs was executed on 1 June 1660. This was the Quaker Mary Dyer, who was hanged from the oak by the Puritan government of Boston for repeatedly defying a law that banned Quakers from the Massachusetts Bay Colony.

Public speaking 

The Common's status as a civic property led to its use as a public speaking grounds, frequently used by evangelists like George Whitefield, the orator who famously persuaded a reluctant Benjamin Franklin to part with all the money he carried (more than $2,000 adjusted) during a 1739 meeting in Philadelphia.

On 19 May 1713, two-hundred citizens rioted on the Common, in what would become known as the Boston Bread Riot, in reaction to a serious food shortage in the city. They later attacked the ships and warehouses of wealthy merchant Andrew Belcher, who was exporting grain to the British West Indies for higher profits. The lieutenant governor was shot during the riot.

The Common was used as a military camp by the British before the American Revolutionary War and it was from the Common that they set off for the Battle of Lexington and Concord.

Use as park

Firework displays over Boston Common began as early as July 3, 1745, in celebration of the fall of Louisburg, followed by the celebration of the repeal of the Stamp Act on May 19, 1766, and the first anniversary of the signing of the Declaration of Independence on July 4, 1777. True park status seems to have emerged no later than 1830, when the grazing of cows was ended and renaming the Common as Washington Park was proposed. Renaming the bordering Sentry Street to Park Place (later to be called Park Street) in 1804 already acknowledged the reality. By 1836, an ornamental iron fence fully enclosed the Common and its five perimeter malls, or recreational promenade; the first of which, Tremont Mall, was in imitation of St. James's Park in London and had been in place since 1728. Given these improvements dating back to 1728, a case could be made that Boston Common is in fact the world's first public urban park, since these developments precede the establishment of the earliest public urban parks in England—Derby Arboretum (1840), Peel Park, Salford (1846), and Birkenhead Park (1847)—which are often considered the first. The park was originally "out of bounds" for Black and American Indian people, a restriction that was fought by the Black community in Boston until it was lifted on July 4, 1836.

Originally, the Charles Street side of Boston Common—along with the adjacent portions of the Public Garden—were used as an unofficial dumping ground due to them being in the lowest-lying portions of the two parks; this, along with the Garden originally having been a salt marsh, resulted in the portions of the two parks being "a moist stew that reeked and that was a mess to walk over" and driving visitors away from these areas. This finally changed in the summer of 1895, when the required quantity of soil was made available as a result of the excavation of the Tremont Street subway, and was used to regrade the Charles Street sides of both Boston Common and the Public Garden.

A hundred people gathered on the Common in early 1965 to protest the Vietnam War. A second protest happened on October 15, 1969, this time with 100,000 people protesting in the Moratorium to End the War in Vietnam.

Today, the Common serves as a public park for all to use for formal or informal gatherings. Events such as concerts, protests, softball games, and ice skating (on Frog Pond) often take place in the park. Famous individuals such as Martin Luther King Jr. and Pope John Paul II have made speeches there. Judy Garland gave her largest concert ever (100,000+ attendees) on the Common, on August 31, 1967.

It was declared a U.S. National Historic Landmark in 1987. The Boston Common is a public park managed by the Boston Park Department and cared for by Friends of the Public Garden, a private advocacy group, which also provides additional funding for maintenance and special events.

Mikhail Gorbachev gave a speech at the Common on May 31, 1990, on his way to Washington, D.C., to sign agreements with U.S. President George H. W. Bush.

On October 21, 2006, the Common became the site of a new world record, when 30,128 Jack-o'-lanterns were lit simultaneously around the park at the Life Is Good Pumpkin Festival. The previous record, held by Keene, New Hampshire, since 2003, was 28,952.

On August 27, 2007, two teenagers were shot on the Common. One of the bullets fired during the shooting struck the Massachusetts State House. A strict curfew has since been enforced, which has been protested by the homeless population of Boston.

On January 21, 2017, approximately 175,000 people marched from the Common to the Back Bay vicinity to profess resistance to the anti-female viewpoints held by president Donald Trump.

On August 19, 2017, approximately 40,000 people marched from Roxbury Crossings to Boston Common to protest hate speech and white supremacy, in the wake of events at the Unite the Right rally in Charlottesville, VA, the week prior. A right-wing "Free Speech" rally had been planned on Boston Common, which some feared would draw members of the KKK, Neo-Nazis, and other hate groups. Boston Mayor Marty Walsh deemed the "Fight Supremacy" counterprotest a great success.

Notable features

Grounds

The Common forms the southern foot of Beacon Hill. Boston Common is the southern end of Boston's Freedom Trail.

The Boston Common Frog Pond sits at the heart of Boston Common. Managed by The Skating Club of Boston in partnership with the City of Boston, Frog Pond is home to a winter ice skating rink and learn-to-skate school, a reflecting pool in the spring and fall, and a summer spray pool and children's carousel.

The softball fields lie in the southwest corner of the Common. A grassy area forms the western part of the park and is most commonly used for the park's largest events. A parking garage lies under this part of the Common. A granite slab there commemorates Pope John Paul II's October 1, 1979, visit to Boston.  The Pope said mass that day to an estimated 400,000 people.

In 1913 and 1986, prehistoric sites were discovered on the Common indicating Native American presence in the area as far back as 8,500 years ago.

Since 1971, the Province of Nova Scotia has donated the annual Christmas Tree to the City of Boston as an enduring thank-you for the relief efforts of the Boston Red Cross and the Massachusetts Public Safety Committee following the Halifax Explosion of 1917.

Structures
 The Boston Common Tablet is installed near the corner of Park Street and Tremont Street.
 Declaration of Independence Tablet
 Plaque to the Great Elm tree, which had been adorned with lanterns to represent liberty, used as a point of fortification, and used for hangings. It was destroyed in a storm in 1876.
 The Robert Gould Shaw Memorial to Robert Gould Shaw and the Afro-American 54th Massachusetts Volunteer Infantry stands at Beacon and Park Streets, the northeast corner of the Common, opposite the State House.
 The Soldiers and Sailors Monument is a victory column on Flag Staff Hill in the Common, commemorating Civil War dead.
 The Boston Massacre Monument was dedicated November 14, 1888.
 The Oneida Football Club Monument memorializes the Common as the site of the first organized football games in the United States, played by the Oneida Football Club in 1862.
 Brewer Fountain stands near the corner of Park and Tremont Streets, by Park Street Station.
 Boylston and Park Street stations, the first two subway stations in the United States, lie underneath the southern and eastern corners of the park, respectively; both stations have been in near-continuous operation since the opening of the first portion of the Tremont Street subway (now part of the MBTA's Green Line) on September 1, 1897.
 Parkman Bandstand, in the eastern part of the park, is used in musical and theatrical productions.
 Parkman Plaza features the statues Industry, Learning, and Religion.

Neighboring structures

 The Massachusetts State House stands across Beacon Street from the northern edge of the Common.
 The Boston Public Garden, a more formal landscaped park, lies to the west of the Common across Charles Street (and was originally considered an extension of the Common).
 The Masonic Grand Lodge of Massachusetts headquarters sits across from the southern corner of the Common at the intersection of Boylston and Tremont Streets.
 Across from the southern corner of the Common, along Boylston and Tremont Streets, lies the campus of Emerson College.
 Across from the Common, to the southeast, Suffolk University has a dormitory on Tremont Street.

Notable recurring events
 Frog Pond Skating Spectacular at the Boston Tree Lighting and First Night Boston, featuring skaters from The Skating Club of Boston
 Commonwealth Shakespeare Company's Shakespeare on the Common
 Boston Lyric Opera's Outdoor Opera Series
 Ancient Fishweir Project Installation Event
 Massachusetts Cannabis Reform Coalition's Freedom Rally
 Lighting of the Christmas tree gifted by Halifax, Nova Scotia.
 Fireworks display on the evening of December 31 as part of Boston's First Night celebration

See also
 Alameda Central
 Boston martyrs
 Common land
 Granary Burying Ground
 King's Chapel Burying Ground
 List of National Historic Landmarks in Boston
 National Register of Historic Places listings in northern Boston
 List of parks in Boston

References

Further reading
 The public rights in Boston Common: Being the report of a committee of citizens. Boston: Press of Rockwell and Churchill, 1877 Google books
 Samuel Barber. Boston Common: a diary of notable events, incidents, and neighboring occurrences, 2nd ed. Boston: Christopher Publishing House, 1916. Internet Archive

External links

 "A View on Cities," article on Boston Common
 Boston National Historical Park
 Friends of the Public Garden, an advocacy group formed in 1970 to preserve and enhance Boston Common
 New York Historical Society. Afternoon Rainbow, Boston Common from Charles Street Mall. Watercolor by George Harvey, 19th century
 BPL. Illus. by Winslow Homer
 City of Boston Archives. Ticket for July 4, 1883 bicycle race
 City of Boston, Boston Landmarks Commission Boston Common Study Report

 
1634 establishments in Massachusetts
Busking venues
Emerald Necklace
Historic districts in Suffolk County, Massachusetts
History of Boston
National Historic Landmarks in Boston
Parks in Boston
Urban public parks
Historic districts on the National Register of Historic Places in Massachusetts
National Register of Historic Places in Boston